Calleagris is a genus of skippers in the family Hesperiidae.

Species
Calleagris hollandi (Butler, 1897)
Calleagris jamesoni (Sharpe, 1890)
Calleagris kobela (Trimen, 1864)
Calleagris krooni Vári, 1974
Calleagris lacteus (Mabille, 1877)
Calleagris landbecki (Druce, 1910)

References
Natural History Museum Lepidoptera genus database

External links
Calleagris at funet
 Seitz, A. Die Gross-Schmetterlinge der Erde 13: Die Afrikanischen Tagfalter. Plate XIII 76

Tagiadini
Hesperiidae genera